Miriam Kolodziejová and Markéta Vondroušová were the defending champions, but Kolodziejová was ineligible to participate this year. Vondroušová played alongside Anastasia Dețiuc, but lost in the first round to Claire Liu and Charlotte Robillard-Millette.

Paula Arias Manjón and Olga Danilović won the title, defeating Olesya Pervushina and Anastasia Potapova in the final, 3–6, 6–3, [10–8].

Seeds

Draw

Finals

Top half

Bottom half

External links 

Girls' Doubles
French Open, 2016 Girls' Doubles